The Kansas City Southern Railway Company  is an American Class I railroad. Founded in 1887, it operates in 10 Midwestern and Southeastern U.S. states: Illinois, Missouri, Kansas, Oklahoma, Arkansas, Tennessee, Alabama, Mississippi, Louisiana and Texas. KCS has the shortest north-south rail route between Kansas City, Missouri, and several key ports along the Gulf of Mexico.

KCS operates over a railroad system consisting of  that extend south to the Mexico–United States border at which point another KCS-operated railroad, Kansas City Southern de México (KCSM), hauls freight into northeastern and central Mexico and to several Gulf of Mexico ports and the Pacific Port of Lázaro Cárdenas.

Canadian Pacific Railway has been approved to purchase and merge with KCS, creating a combined railroad that will be the first and only to directly serve Canada, Mexico and the United States. The merger will take place as soon as April 14, 2023.

History

Origins (1887–1900) 
Arthur Stilwell began construction on the first line of what would eventually become the Kansas City Southern Railway in 1887, in suburban Kansas City, Mo. Together with Edward L. Martin, Stilwell built the Kansas City Suburban Belt Railway, which was incorporated in 1887 and began operation in 1890.

In 1897, Stilwell completed the Kansas City, Pittsburg and Gulf Railroad Company (KCP&G) with a route running north and south from Kansas City to Shreveport, Louisiana, terminating at Port Arthur, Texas. In order to comply with Louisiana laws Stilwell, William S. Taylor, E. L. Martin, and others, officers of the Missouri, Kansas & Texas Trust Company of Kansas City, Missouri, as well as the KCP&G, incorporated the Kansas City, Shreveport & Gulf Railway Company (KCS&G) on September 27, 1894, to build or acquire railroads in Louisiana. The Arkansas Construction Company completed a 41.10-mile line from Arkansas-Louisiana State line (northern terminus with the Texarkana & Fort Smith Railway Company) to Shreveport on April 15, 1896. The Kansas City Terminal Construction Company completed a 76.40-mile Shreveport to Many line on October 26, 1896, an 85.80-mile Many to De Quincy line on June 30, 1897, and the 19.16-mile De Quincy to the Louisiana-Texas state line on September 11, 1897, where the southern terminus was with the Texarkana & Fort Smith Railway Company. A 26.60-mile narrow gauge branch line was acquired from the Calcasieu, Vernon & Shreveport Railway Company (CV&S), through the Arkansas Construction Company, that ran from De Quincy, West Lake, Lake Charles, and Lockport, and the construction company widened the tracks to standard gauge.  
In 1895 the KCP&G entered into a contract with the KCS&G to operate and maintain its property.

In 1900, KCP&G was taken over by the Kansas City Southern Railway Company (KCS).

By 1914 the KCS owned the separate entities of the Arkansas Western Railway Company, Fort Smith & Van Buren Railway Company, Kansas City, Shreveport & Gulf Railway Company, the Kansas City, Shreveport & Gulf Terminal Company, the Maywood & Sugar Creek Railway Company, the Port Arthur Canal & Dock Company, the Poteau Valley Railroad Company, the Texarkana & Fort Smith Railway Company, the Arkansas Western Railway Company, the Glenn Pool Tank Line Company, the Joplin Union Depot Company, the Kansas City Terminal Railway Company, and the K. C. S. Elevator Company.

20th century (1900–2000) 
In 1962, Kansas City Southern Industries, Inc. (KCSI) was established when the company began to diversify its interests into other industries. At that time, KCS became a subsidiary of KCSI. In 2002, KCSI formally changed its name to Kansas City Southern (KCS), with KCS remaining a subsidiary.

From 1940 to 1969, the Kansas City Southern operated two primary passenger trains, the Flying Crow (Trains #15 & 16) between Kansas City and Port Arthur (discontinued on May 11, 1968) and the Southern Belle (Trains #1 & 2) between Kansas City and New Orleans (discontinued on November 2, 1969). In 1995, a new Southern Belle was created as an executive train to entertain shippers and guests. It also pulls the Holiday Express train in December, making the rounds to several KCS cities and stations.

21st century (2000–present)

Merger with Canadian Pacific, competing bid by Canadian National 
On March 21, 2021, the Canadian Pacific Railway (CP) announced that it was planning to purchase KCS for US$29 billion. The US Surface Transportation Board (STB) would first have to approve the purchase, which was expected to be completed by the middle of 2022. 

However, a competing cash and stock offer was later made by Canadian National Railway (CN) on April 20, 2021 at $33.7 billion. On May 13, 2021, KCS announced in a statement that they planned to accept the higher offer from CN, but would give CP until May 21 to come up with a higher bid, which was not made. However, CN's merger attempt would be blocked by a STB ruling in August 2021 that the company could not use a voting trust to assume control of KCS, due to concerns about potentially reduced competition in the railroad industry.

On September 12, 2021 KCS accepted a new $31 billion offer from CP. Though CP's offer was lower than the offer made by CN, the STB permitted CP to use a voting trust to take control of KCS. The voting trust allowed CP to become the beneficial owner of KCS in December 2021, but the two railroads operated independently until receiving approval for a merger of operations from the STB. That approval came on March 15, 2023, which permitted the railroads to merge as soon as April 14, 2023.

Operations
KCS hauls freight for seven major government and business sectors: agriculture and minerals, military, automotive, chemical and petroleum, energy, industrial and consumer products and intermodal.

KCS has the shortest north-south rail route between Kansas City, Missouri, and several key ports along the Gulf of Mexico in Alabama, Louisiana, Mississippi and Texas. The KCS, along with the Union Pacific railroad, is one of only two Class I railroads based in the United States that has not originated as the result of a merger between previously separate companies.

The company owns or contracts with intermodal facilities along its rail network in Kansas City, Mo; Jackson, Miss.; Wylie, Texas; Kendleton, Texas; and Laredo, Texas.

KCS operates over a railroad system consisting of  that extend south to the Mexico–United States border at which point another KCS railroad, Kansas City Southern de México (KCSM), can haul freight into northeastern and central Mexico and to the Gulf of Mexico ports of Tampico, Altamira, and Veracruz, as well as to the Pacific Port of Lázaro Cárdenas, fulfilling the vision of KCS founder Arthur Edward Stilwell.

Corporate structure 

Kansas City Southern Railway is owned by Kansas City Southern (until 2002: Kansas City Southern Industries), which in turn also owns other companies like Kansas City Southern de México and the Panama Canal Railway's operator, Panama Canal Railway Company.

Awards and recognition 
In 2017, KCS, an American Chemistry Council (ACC) Responsible Care partner, received an Exceptional Merit designation. The ACC honored KCS for implementing energy management technology, Trip Optimizer, which improves KCS’s energy efficiency.

The E. H. Harriman Award was an award formerly bestowed on railroads for rail safety. KCS had been consistently recognized for its employee safety record (in group B: line-haul railroads with between four and 15 million employee hours per year) by the E.H. Harriman Memorial Awards Institute with a Gold Award in 2001, 2002, 2006, 2007 and 2008, Bronze Award in 2003 and 2004 and a Silver Award in 2005.

In addition, KCS annually awards its “Safe Shipper” customers for originating more than 500 bulk hazmat shipments annually without incident with KCS’s Hazmat Shipper Safety Appreciation Award.

Bibliography 
 Kansas City Southern History (2008), History of the Kansas City Southern Railway. Retrieved July 7, 2008.
 "Kansas City Southern Color Pictorial", Steve Allen Goen, 1999

References

External links 

 
 Kansas City Southern Historical Society

 
Alabama railroads
Arkansas railroads
Illinois railroads
Kansas railroads
Louisiana railroads
Mississippi railroads
Missouri railroads
Nebraska railroads
Oklahoma railroads
Tennessee railroads
Texas railroads
Economy of the Midwestern United States
Economy of the Southeastern United States
Class I railroads in North America
Railway companies established in 1900